Glen Walshaw (born 25 July 1976) is a Zimbabwean former swimmer, who specialized in sprint and middle-distance freestyle events. He is a double medalist at the All-Africa Games (1999), and later represented Zimbabwe at the 2000 Summer Olympics in Sydney. For almost thirteen years, Walshaw currently holds a Zimbabwean record in the 200 m freestyle. While studying in the United States, he received two All-American honors in the freestyle relay as a member of the Alabama Crimson Tide swimming and diving team.

At the 1999 All-Africa Games in Johannesburg, South Africa, Walshaw won a total of two medals: a silver medal in the 200 m freestyle (1:55.85) and bronze in the 400 m freestyle (4:09.65).

Walshaw competed in a freestyle double (both 100 and 200 m) at the 2000 Summer Olympics in Sydney. He posted FINA B-standards of 52.08 (100 m freestyle) and 1:52.75 (200 m freestyle) from the U.S. National Championships in Fort Lauderdale, Florida. In the 200 m freestyle, Walshaw placed fortieth on the morning prelims. Swimming in heat four, he rounded out the field to last place in a new Zimbabewan record of 1:54.70. Two days later, in the 100 m freestyle, Walshaw challenged seven other swimmers in the same heat, including Fiji's three-time Olympian Carl Probert. He raced to seventh place and fifty-second overall in 52.53, more than half a second off his entry time.

References

1976 births
Living people
Zimbabwean male freestyle swimmers
Swimmers at the 1994 Commonwealth Games
Commonwealth Games competitors for Zimbabwe
Swimmers at the 2000 Summer Olympics
Olympic swimmers of Zimbabwe
Alabama Crimson Tide men's swimmers
Sportspeople from Harare
White Zimbabwean sportspeople
Zimbabwean people of British descent
African Games silver medalists for Zimbabwe
African Games medalists in swimming
African Games bronze medalists for Zimbabwe
Competitors at the 1999 All-Africa Games
20th-century Zimbabwean people
21st-century Zimbabwean people